Rabbi Menachem Mendel Hager (born November 28, 1957) is one of the two Grand Rabbis of the Viznitz (Admor Mviznitz) Hasidic dynasty in Bnei Brak and a current member of Moetzes Gedolei HaTorah (Council of great Torah Sages) of the Agudat Yisrael movement.

Biography
Rabbi Mendel was born in Israel to Grand Rabbi Moshe Yehoshua Hager, the previous spiritual leader of the Vizhnitzer Hassidim and to Rebbetzin Leah Esther, the daughter of Rabbi Menachem Mendel Paneth of Deyzh who was murdered in the Holocaust, and after whom Rabbi Mendel was named. He is the youngest of six siblings. As a child, he received his education in the Vizhnitz educational institutions. About a year after his Bar Mitzvah, he traveled to the United States to study in the Skverer Yeshiva. In 1976, he married Rebbetzin Miriam, daughter of Rabbi Avrohom Dovid Horowitz (deceased) who served as the Chief Rabbi of the Ultra-orthodox community in Strasbourg, France, and later as a member of the Edah HaChareidis in Jerusalem. In 1984, their father, Rabbi Moshe Yehoshua Hager, removed the older brother Rabbi Yisroel from his main post as Chief Rabbi of Vizhnitz, and expelled him from the Vizhnitz community as well. In 1990, on the orders of Rabbi Moshe Yehoshua, Rabbi Mendel was crowned to serve as a Chief Rabbi of The Vizhnitzer Hassidim and also was destined to become his father's heir and to take over the leadership. In 2002, the older brother, Rabbi Yisroel, returned to Vizhnitz and was given back his post according to multiple sources close to the father he was forced to bring back his older son. The overwhelming majority of the Hassidim supported Rabbi Yisroel, and only a few hundred families followed Rabbi Mendel who decided to separate from his brother's community and establish his own community. In 2009, he founded his synagogue and Yeshiva on Shlomo Hamelech Street, which is located near the Vizhnitz neighborhood. 
In March 2012, after his father died, Rabbi Mendel was officially crowned as a Grand Rabbi of his community. Despite the dispute in the past, the two brothers currently maintain a good relationship and attend each other's family events.

Children
Rebbetzin Machle, the wife of Rabbi Yoel Moshe Mordecai Katz, son of Grand Rabbi Usher Anshil of Vien (Hasidic community) in Williamsburg.
Rabbi Chaim Meir, married Rebbetzin Nechama Mirel, daughter of Grand Rabbi Naftali Tzvi Weiss of Spinka Borough Park – Serves as a Chief Rabbi of his father's followers in the United States.
Rebbetzin Sarah Rivkah, the wife of Rabbi Boruch Hager, son of Grand Rabbi Ya'kov Hager of Seret Vizhnitz ( A branch of the Vizhnitz dynasty) in Haifa.
Rebbetzin Margulis, was married to Rabbi David Rosenbaum, son of Grand Rabbi Meir of Premishlan.They divorced in 2019.

References

External links
  On 5tjt.com
  On Ynet.
  On Haaretz
  On Matzav

Haredi rabbis in Israel
Hasidic rabbis in Israel
Rebbes of Vizhnitz
1957 births
Living people